Opechancanough (1554–1646) was paramount chief of the Powhatan Confederacy in present-day Virginia from 1618 until his death. He had been a leader in the confederacy formed by his older brother Powhatan, from whom he inherited the paramountcy.

Opechancanough led the Powhatan in the second and third Anglo-Powhatan Wars, including the Indian massacre of 1622.

In 1646, the aged Opechancanough was captured by English colonists and taken to Jamestown, where he was killed by a settler assigned to guard him.

Name 
The name Opechancanough meant "He whose Soul is White" in the Algonquian Powhatan language.

It was likely derived from a Powhatan original phonemically spelled as /a·pečehčakeno·w/ < a·pe "white" + čehčak "soul" + -en "inanimate verb ending" + -o·w "3rd person transitive inanimate subject". This would have the reconstructed pronunciation  or perhaps  with nasal spreading and haplology.

Powhatan warrior
The Powhatan Confederacy was established in the late 16th and early 17th centuries under the leadership of Chief Wahunsonacock (who was more commonly known as Chief Powhatan, named for the tribe he originally led, which was based near present-day Richmond, Virginia). Over a period of years, through negotiation and/or coercion, Chief Powhatan united more than 31 of the Virginia Indian tribal groups in the Tidewater region of what is now the Commonwealth of Virginia, essentially the southeastern portion of the modern state.

At the time of the English settlement at Jamestown, which was established in May 1607, Opechancanough was a much-feared warrior and a charismatic leader of the Powhatans. As Chief Powhatan's younger brother (or possibly half-brother), he headed a tribe situated along the Pamunkey River near the present-day town of West Point.

Known to be strongly opposed to the European settlers, he captured Captain John Smith along the Chickahominy River and brought him before Chief Powhatan at Werowocomoco, one of the two capital villages of the Powhatans. Located along the northern shore of the present-day York River, Werowocomoco was the site where the famous incident with Powhatan's young daughter Matoaka (known as Pocahontas to historians) intervening on Smith's behalf during a ceremony is thought to have occurred, based upon Smith's account.

Written accounts by other colonists confirm that Pocahontas subsequently did serve as an intermediary between the natives and the colonists, and helped deliver crucial food during the winter of 1607–08, when the colonists' fort at Jamestown Island burned in an accidental fire in January 1608.

The marriage of Pocahontas and colonist John Rolfe in April 1614 brought a period of peace; this ended not long after her death while on a trip to England and the death of her father, Wahunsonacock, in 1618. A short time later, after a brief succession of the chiefdom by his older brother Opitchapam (during which Opechancanough was war chief), Opechancanough became paramount chief of the Powhatan Confederacy.

Powhatan chief
The natives and the colonists came into increasingly irreconcilable conflicts as the land-hungry export of crops, tobacco (which had been first developed by John Rolfe), became the cash crop of the colony. The relationship became even more strained as ever-increasing numbers of Europeans arrived and began establishing "hundreds" and plantations along the navigable rivers.

Beginning with the Indian massacre of 1622, in which his forces killed many settlers, Chief Opechancanough abandoned diplomacy with the English colonists as a means of settling conflicts and tried to force them to abandon the region altogether. On March 22, 1622, approximately a third of the settlers in Virginia were killed by Powhatan forces during a series of coordinated attacks along both shores of the James River, extending from Newport News Point, near the mouth of the river, all the way to Falling Creek, near the Fall Line at the head of navigation. The colony eventually rebounded, however, and later they killed hundreds of natives in retaliation, including many warriors poisoned by Dr. John Potts at Jamestown.

Chief Opechancanough launched a last major effort to expel the colonists on April 18, 1644, the third Anglo-Powhatan War. In 1646, forces under Royal Governor William Berkeley captured Opechancanough, at the time believed to be between 90 and 100 years old. They paraded him as a prisoner through Jamestown before a jeering crowd; the chief was subsequently killed by a settler, who shot him in the back while assigned to guard him. Before dying, the chief reportedly said, "If it had been my fortune to take Sir William Berkeley prisoner, I would not have meanly exposed him as a show to my people."

He was succeeded as Weroance first by Nectowance, then by Totopotomoi, then by Cockacoeske, Totopotomoi's wife who is believed to be Opechancanough's daughter or granddaughter.

Connection with Don Luis

Historians, including Carl Bridenbaugh, have speculated that Opechancanough was the same Native American youth who was a chief's son and is known to have been transported voluntarily from the village of Kiskiack, Virginia, to Spain in the 16th century at the age of 17 and educated. He became known as Don Luis. Murrin, however, suggests that Opechancanough was more likely the nephew or cousin of Don Luis.

Rechristened as "Don Luis", the young man returned to his homeland in what is now the Virginia Peninsula subregion of the Hampton Roads region of Virginia, where Jesuit priests established their Ajacán Mission in September 1570. Shortly thereafter, Don Luis is believed to have returned to live with the Powhatan and turned against the Europeans. Don Luis and his allies killed the Jesuits at the mission in the winter of 1571, ending Spanish efforts to colonize the area.

Other historians speculate that Don Luis may have become the father of Powhatan chiefs Wahunsunacock and Opechancanough. Their remains are buried on the Pamunkey Indian Reservation in King William, Virginia.

Illness
From various contemporary reports, it is speculated that Opechancanough suffered from myasthenia gravis. These reports include symptoms of weakness which improved with resting, and visible drooping of the eyelids.

Representations
Opechancanough was portrayed by Stuart Randall in the 1953 low-budget film Captain John Smith and Pocahontas. This film shortened his name to Opechanco.
He appeared as a figure in the Animated Hero Classics 1994 episode "Pocahontas," and was voiced by Lorenzo Gonzalez, but is entirely absent in Disney's 1995 animated film Pocahontas as well as its 1998 direct-to-video sequel Pocahontas II: Journey to a New World.  
Opechancanough is portrayed in New Line Cinema's 2005 film The New World, in which he is portrayed by Wes Studi. In this live action film, he is conflated with Tomocomo, a priest who accompanied Pocahontas/Rebecca to London.
He appears in the Sky TV show Jamestown where he is played by Raoul Max Trujillo.

See also
History of Virginia
Nemattanew

References

Further reading

James Horn, A Brave and Cunning Prince: The Great Chief Opechancanough, 2021.
W. Martha W. McCartney, Cockacoeske, Queen of Pamunkey: Diplomat and Suzeraine.
David A. Price, Love and Hate in Jamestown: John Smith, Pocahontas, and the Start of A New Nation, Alfred A. Knopf, 2003
Helen C. Rountree, The Powhatan Indians of Virginia: Their Traditional Culture. University of Oklahoma Press, 1989.
Helen C. Rountree. Powhatan Foreign Relations: 1500-1722, Charlottesville: University of Virginia Press. 1993.
Alan Taylor. American Colonies, New York: Viking, 2001.
Peter H. Wood, Powhatan's Mantle: Indians in the Colonial Southeast

External links
Jamestown 2007
The Anglo-Powhatan Wars

1554 births
1646 deaths
Murdered Native American people
Native American leaders
People of the Powhatan Confederacy
17th-century Native Americans
People murdered in Virginia
Burials in Virginia
Virginia colonial people
Tribal chiefs
Pamunkey people
Murder in 1646
Murder in the Thirteen Colonies